LWO may refer to:

 Latino World Order, a professional wrestling stable
 LightWave Object (file format)
 Luo peoples or Lwo, an African ethnic linguistic group
 Luo people of Kenya and Tanzania, an indigenous people of Kenya and Tanzania
 Luo languages, languages spoken by the Luo peoples
 Lango language (Uganda), a Western Nilotic language of the Luo languages
 Lviv Danylo Halytskyi International Airport (IATA code)

See also 
 Luo (disambiguation)